Journey to the East is a short novel by German author Hermann Hesse. It was first published in German in 1932 as Die Morgenlandfahrt. This novel came directly after his biggest international success, Narcissus and Goldmund.

Plot summary
Journey to the East is written from the point of view of a man (called "H. H." in the book) who becomes a member of "The League", a timeless religious sect whose members include famous fictional and real characters, such as Plato, Mozart, Pythagoras, Paul Klee, Don Quixote, Puss in Boots, Tristram Shandy, Baudelaire, Goldmund (from Hesse's Narcissus and Goldmund), the artist Klingsor (from Hesse's Klingsor's Last Summer), and the ferryman Vasudeva (from Hesse's Siddhartha). A branch of the group goes on a pilgrimage to "the East" in search of the "ultimate Truth". The narrator speaks of traveling through both time and space, across geography imaginary and real.

Although at first fun and enlightening, the Journey runs into a crisis in a deep mountain gorge called Morbio Inferiore when Leo, apparently a simple servant, disappears, causing the group to plummet into anxiety and argument. Leo is described as happy, pleasant, handsome, beloved by everyone, having a rapport with animals – to a discerning reader, he seems a great deal more than a simple servant, but nobody in the pilgrimage, including the narrator, seems to realise this. Nor does anyone seem to wonder why the group dissolves in dissension and bickering after Leo disappears. Instead they accuse Leo of taking with him various objects which they seem to be missing (and which turn up later) and which they regard as very important (and which later turn out not to be very important), and they blame him for the eventual disintegration of the group and failure of the Journey.

Years later, the narrator tries to write his story of the Journey, even though he has lost contact with the group and believes the League no longer exists. But he is unable to put together any coherent account of it; his whole life has sunk into despair and disillusionment since the failure of the one thing which was most important to him, and he has even sold the violin with which he once offered music to the group during the Journey. Finally, at the advice of a friend, he finds the servant Leo and, having failed in his attempt to re-establish communication with him or even be recognized by him when he meets him on a park bench, writes him a long, impassioned letter of "grievances, remorse and entreaty" and posts it to him that night.

The next morning, Leo appears in the narrator's home and tells him he has to appear before the High Throne to be judged by the officials of the League. It turns out (to the narrator's surprise) that Leo, the simple servant, is actually President of the League, and at points seems like Pablo, from Hesse's Steppenwolf. The crisis in Morbio Inferiore was a test of faith which the narrator and everyone else flunked rather dismally. H. H. discovers that his "aberration" and time spent adrift was part of his trial, and is allowed to return to the League if he can pass any new test of faith and obedience. What he chooses, and the final dénouement, is a stroke of Hesse's typical Eastern mysticism at its finest.

References 

1932 German-language novels
Novels by Hermann Hesse
1932 German novels